The Hatpin is a musical by James Millar (book and lyrics) and Peter Rutherford (composer).  It was inspired by the true story of Amber Murray who in 1892 gave up her son to the Makin family in Sydney, Australia.  Written and developed in 2006–2007, The Hatpin opened at the York Theatre, Seymour Centre in Sydney on 27 February 2008. The musical has received subsequent productions in Australia, the United Kingdom and the United States.

Synopsis

The Hatpin is the true story of a single mother, Amber Murray, who advertised her baby in a newspaper trading column in the hope of saving his life. Baby farmers take the child in return for regular support payments, but in fact murder the child. Eventually the evil couple are arrested and tried for the murder of several infants - leading to one of the most moving criminal trials in Australian history. Using the moral support she gains from her friendship with the free-spirited Harriet Piper, Amber fights the injustices of circumstance and tragedy to find hope and strength.

Productions
The original Australian production of The Hatpin opened at the York Theatre, Seymour Centre in Sydney on 27 February 2008, produced by Neil Gooding Productions and White Box Theatre. It starred Melle Stewart, Peter Cousens, Michelle Doake, Gemma-Ashley Kaplan, Caroline O'Connor and Barry Crocker.

The Hatpin made its US premiere on 15 September 2008 at the American Theatre of Actors in the Chernuchin Theatre as a participant of the New York Musical Theatre Festival. Caroline O'Connor followed The Hatpin overseas to reprise her role of Harriet Piper, as did Gemma-Ashley Kaplan, who returned to play Clara Makin.

In 2011 The Hatpin made its Melbourne premiere with Magnormos at Theatre Works, St. Kilda, with a season from 16 to 28 May. It was directed by Shaun Kingma with musical direction by Sophie Thomas.

The musical received a London fringe production from 30 October to 24 November 2012 at the Blue Elephant Theatre, in a Heather Doole, Blue Elephant & Greenwich Theatre co-production in association with Lazarus Theatre. Additional cast members Ziggie Sky Ward, Grace Lewis, Elly Lowney, and Linda Taimre appeared as Abigail Holt, Sarah McFarland, Elizabeth Hope, and Mary Edwards, respectively.

The West Australian premiere of The Hatpin took place at South Perth's Old Mill Theatre from 11 July to 20 July 2014. Tim Prosser, Nicholas Cruse, Mitchell Crouch, David Cosgrove, and Luke Heath all appeared in minor roles.

Roles and principal casts

Musical numbers

Act 1
"Hymn" – Cast
"Twisted Little Town" – Cast
"Puddles" – Amber Murray
"Holding You" – Amber Murray
"Work" – Amber Murray and Cast
"Bad Fruit" – Harriet Piper and Amber Murray
"Knock Knock Knock" – Cast
"Enough" – Amber Murray
"Knock Knock Knock (Reprise)" – Cast
"Gathering Sirens" – Minnie Davies, Marianne Leonard, Rebecca Rigby and the Makins
"Steal Away" – Charlie and Agatha Makin
"Underscore / Twisted Little Town (Reprise)" – Minnie Davies, Marianne Leonard and Rebecca Rigby
"The Hand of Courage" – Harriet Piper and Amber Murray
"Digging Up" – James Hanoney and Cast

Act 2 
"Holding You (Reprise)" – Amber Murray
"So Much More Than Me" – Amber Murray
"Why Did I Give Him Away?" – Amber Murray, Minnie Davies, Marianne Leonard and Rebecca Rigby
"Headline (2)" – Cast (Press Agents)
"Sail" – Harriet Piper and Clara Makin
"Something Like Being a Mother" – Harriet Piper
"Natural Causes" – Thomas Williamson, Charlie and Agatha Makin and Press Agents
"Headline (3)" – Press Agents
"The Hatpin" – Clara Makin
"The Verdict" – Cast and Justice Stephen
"Finale: Tiny Glow / Sail (Reprise)" – Cast

Recording
An original cast album was released in 2008 by Neil Gooding Productions.

Track listing

Awards and nominations
 2008 Sydney Theatre Awards
 Best New Australian Work – Peter Rutherford and James Millar (nominee)
 Judith Johnson Award for Best Performance by an Actress in a Musical – Michelle Doake (winner)
 Judith Johnson Award for Best Performance by an Actress in a Musical – Gemma-Ashley Kaplan (nominee)
 2011 Melbourne Green Room Awards
 Best Female Artist in a Featured Role (Music Theatre) – Emma Jones (winner)

References

External links
 
 Magnormos site – Melbourne premiere

2008 musicals
Australian musicals
Fiction set in 1892
Musicals inspired by real-life events
Plays set in the 19th century
Plays set in Australia
Sydney in fiction